The 2019 Ivy League men's soccer season was the 65th season of the conference sponsoring men's varsity soccer. The season began in August 2019 and concluded in November 2019.

Princeton entered the 2019 season as the defending conference champions by virtue of having the best regular season record. The Ivy League is one of three NCAA Division I men's soccer conferences that do not have a conference tournament to determine their NCAA Tournament berth (the other two are the Pac-12 and the West Coast Conferences).

Princeton was unable to defend their title, as Yale won their first Ivy League championship since 1989.

Background

Previous season 
The 2018 season was the conference's 64th season sponsoring men's varsity soccer. Princeton won the Ivy League championship with a 5–1–1 record. In the first round, Princeton played Michigan. The match ended in a 1–1 draw, ended with a 14-round penalty shoot-out. There, Princeton lost 10–11 on penalty kicks to Michigan.

Coaching changes 
There have been no coaching changes during the 2018–19 offseason.

Head coaches

Preseason

Preseason poll 
The preseason poll was released on August 28, 2019.

Preseason national polls 
The preseason national polls will be released in July and August 2019.

Regular season

Early season tournaments 

Early season tournaments will be announced in late Spring and Summer 2019.

Postseason

NCAA Tournament 

The NCAA Tournament will begin in November 2019 and conclude on December 17, 2019.

Rankings

National rankings

Regional rankings - USC Northeast Region 

The United Soccer Coaches' Northeast poll features teams from the Ivy League, America East, NEC, and MAAC.

Awards and honors

Player of the week honors

Postseason honors

Regional awards

2020 MLS Draft

The 2020 MLS SuperDraft was held in January 2020. No players from the Ivy League were selected in the SuperDraft.

Homegrown players 

The Homegrown Player Rule is a Major League Soccer program that allows MLS teams to sign local players from their own development academies directly to MLS first team rosters. Before the creation of the rule in 2008, every player entering Major League Soccer had to be assigned through one of the existing MLS player allocation processes, such as the MLS SuperDraft.

To place a player on its homegrown player list, making him eligible to sign as a homegrown player, players must have resided in that club's home territory and participated in the club's youth development system for at least one year. Players can play college soccer and still be eligible to sign a homegrown contract.

No players from the Ivy League signed homegrown contracts with their parent MLS clubs.

References

External links 
 Ivy League Men's Soccer

 
2019 NCAA Division I men's soccer season